Fredrik Lindgren (born 28 March 1966) is a Swedish professional golfer.

Lindgren played 202 events on the European Tour 1991–2000 where his best performances were runner-up at the 1992 Murphy's English Open and a third place at the 1994 Italian Open. 

Lindgren also played on the Challenge Tour where he won the 1990 Scandinavian Tipo Trophy and the 1998 Albarella International Open, and finished runner-up at the 1997 Alianca UAP Challenger and the 1998 Open de Cote d'Ivoire.

After retiring from the tour, Lindgren became head of the ETPI, The European Tour Performance Institute, which combines golf coaching and sports science in order to optimize golfer's capabilities.

Professional wins (2)

Challenge Tour wins (2)

Team appearances
Amateur
European Boys' Team Championship(representing Sweden): 1982, 1983 (winners)
Jacques Léglise Trophy (representing the Continent of Europe): 1983
St Andrews Trophy (representing the Continent of Europe): 1984, 1988
European Amateur Team Championship (representing Sweden): 1987
Eisenhower Trophy (representing Sweden): 1988

References

External links

Swedish male golfers
European Tour golfers
Sportspeople from Malmö
1966 births
Living people
20th-century Swedish people